Evaldo Silva De Assis (born August 17, 1974) is a Brazilian footballer. He is one of the main footballers who has played for five years in the league with only one club.

Career
Only two clubs have ever he defended during his professional career that is Volta Redonda and Persijap Jepara.

He has played for 13 seasons (1992-2004 and 2011-2012) with Volta Redonda. And he has played for nine seasons (2004-2011 and 2012–present) with Persijap Jepara and became the longest foreign players at the club.

On 29 April 2014, he was appointed as caretaker coach Persijap replace Raja Isa.

References

External links
 Profile in Liga Indonesia Official Website 

1974 births
Living people
Brazilian footballers
Brazilian expatriate footballers
Brazilian expatriate sportspeople in Indonesia
Expatriate footballers in Indonesia
Persijap Jepara players
Liga 1 (Indonesia) players
Association football defenders
People from Barra Mansa